Ralph Fiennes is an English actor of stage and screen. He has been nominated for several Academy Awards, and Primetime Emmy Awards. He received a Tony Award in 1995 for his work on the Broadway stage in Hamlet. He has starred in such critically acclaimed films as Schindler's List (1993), Quiz Show (1994), The English Patient (1996), The End of the Affair (1999), The Constant Gardener (2005), In Bruges, The Duchess, and The Reader (all 2008), The Hurt Locker (2009), and The Grand Budapest Hotel (2014). He also starred as the villain Lord Voldemort in the Harry Potter film series.

Theatre
{| class="wikitable sortable"
|-
! Year
! Title
! Role
! Venue
! class="unsortable" | 
|-
| 1985
|Twelfth Night
| Curio
| Regent's Park Open Air Theatre, London
|
|-
| 1985
|A Midsummer Night's Dream
| Cobweb
|Regent's Park Open Air Theatre, London
|
|-
| 1986
|A Midsummer Night's Dream
| Lysander
| Regent's Park Open Air Theatre, London
|
|-
| 1986
|Romeo and Juliet
| Romeo
| Regent's Park Open Air Theatre, London
|
|-
| 1987
|Six Characters in Search of an Author
| Son
| Royal National Theatre, London
|
|-
| 1987
|Fathers and Sons
| Arkady Nikolayevich Kirsanov
| Royal National Theatre, London
|
|-
| 1987
|Ting Tang Mine
| Lisha Ball
| Royal National Theatre, London
|
|-
| 1988
|Much Ado About Nothing
| Claudio
|Stratford-upon-Avon
|
|-
| 1988–89
|The Plantagenets: Henry VI The Rise of Edward IV, Richard III His Death
| Henry VI
| Stratford-upon-Avon  Barbican Centre, London
|
|-
| 1989
|King John
| Dauphin
|Stratford-upon-Avon The Pit Theatre, London
|
|-
| 1989
|The Man Who Came to Dinner
| Bert Jefferson
| Barbican Centre, London
|
|-
| 1989
|Playing with Trains 
| Gant
| The Pit Theatre, London
|
|-
| 1990
|Troilus and Cressida
| Troilus
| Stratford-upon-Avon
|
|-
| 1990
|King Lear
| Edmund
| Stratford-upon-Avon
|
|-
| 1991
|Love's Labour's Lost
| King of Navarre
|Stratford-upon-Avon  Barbican Centre, London
|
|-
| 1995
|Hamlet
| Hamlet
| Hackney Empire, London  Belasco Theatre, Broadway
|
|-
| 1997
|Ivanov
| Ivanov
| Almeida Theatre, London
|
|-
| 2000
|Coriolanus
| Coriolanus
| BAM Harvey Theatre, Brooklyn
|rowspan=2|
|-
| 2000
|Richard II
| Richard II
| BAM Harvey Theatre, Brooklyn
|-
| 2001
|The Play What I Wrote
| Sir Ralph Fiennes
|Wyndham's Theatre, London
|
|-
| 2003
|The Talking Cure
| Carl Jung
| Royal National Theatre, London
|
|-
| 2003
|Brand
| Brand
|Stratford-upon-AvonTheatre Royal Haymarket, London
|
|-
| 2005
|Julius Caesar
| Mark Antony
|Barbican Centre, London and tour
|
|-
| 2006
|Faith Healer
| Frank Hardy
|Gate Theatre, DublinBooth Theatre, Broadway
| 
|-
| 2007
|First Love
|
|Sydney Festival
|
|-
| 2008
|God of Carnage
| Alain Reille
|Gielgud Theatre, London
|
|-
| 2008
|Oedipus the King
|Oedipus
| Royal National Theatre, London
|
|-
| 2011
|The Tempest
| Prospero 
| Theatre Royal Haymarket, London
|
|-
| 2013
|National Theatre: 50 Years on Stage
| Lambert Le Roux (Pravda)
| Royal National Theatre, London
|
|-
| 2015
|Man and Superman
| Jack Tanner
| Royal National Theatre, London
|
|-
| 2016
|  The Master Builder
| Halvard Solness
| The Old Vic, London
|
|-
| 2016
|Richard III
| Richard, Duke of Gloucester
| Almeida Theatre, London
|
|-
| 2018
|Antony and Cleopatra
| Antony
| Royal National Theatre, London 
|
|-
| 2020
|Beat the Devil
|
| Bridge Theatre, London
|
|-
| 2021
| The Four Quartets
|
| Theatre Royal, Bath/Tour
|-
| 2022
|Straight Line Crazy| Robert Moses
| Bridge Theatre, London  The Shed, Off-Broadway
|   
|-
|}

Film

Television

Video games

Spoken wordWhen Love Speaks'' (2002, EMI Classics) – "Sonnet 129" ("Th'expense of spirit in a waste of shame")

References 

Male actor filmographies